Rakad Mahmoud Salameh Salem (kunya, Abu Mahmoud) is an Iraqi-Palestinian politician and longtime Secretary-General of the Arab Liberation Front (ALF), an Iraqi-controlled Ba'thist faction of the Palestine Liberation Organization (PLO). He was also editor-in-chief of the movement's monthly magazine, Sawt al-Jamahir (Arabic, Voice of the masses).

He lives in Bir Zeit in the West Bank, but was previously active in Lebanon during the Lebanese Civil War as commander of the ALF's military wing. He holds Iraqi citizenship. In 2001, he was arrested by Israeli forces on suspicion of having transferred money from the Iraqi government to families of Palestinian suicide bombers.

References

Living people
Year of birth missing (living people)
Palestine Liberation Organization members
Iraqi people of Palestinian descent
Arab Liberation Front politicians
Palestinian Arab nationalists